This is a list of Canadian television-related events in 1953.

Notable events

Births

Television shows

CBC
CBC News Magazine (1952-1981) 
Crossword Quiz (1952-1953)
The C.G.E. Show (1952-1959) 
Hockey Night in Canada (1952-present) 
Let's See (1952-1953) 
Open House (1952-1962)
Sunshine Sketches (1952-1953)

SRC
Pépinot et Capucine (1952-1954)

Ending this year 
Crossword Quiz (1952-1953)
Let's See (1952-1953) 
Sunshine Sketches (1952-1953)
 The Big Revue (1952-1953)

Television stations

Debuts

See also
1953 in Canada 
1953 in television

References

External links
CBC Directory of Television Series at Queen’s University (Archived March 4, 2016)